Howatt is a surname. Notable people with the surname include:

Charlie Howatt, Green Party of Canada candidate in the 2006 Canadian federal election
Cornelius Howatt (1810–1895), farmer and political figure in Prince Edward Island
Garry Howatt (born 1952), retired Canadian ice hockey forward
Hubert Howatt (1867–1919), farmer and political figure on Prince Edward Island
John Howatt Bell (1846–1929), lawyer and politician from Prince Edward Island, 14th Premier of Prince Edward Island
Lester Alexander Howatt (1909–1994), American businessman and politician

See also
Howat (surname)
Hiwatt
Howitt
Howittia